Eleonora Gonzaga may refer to:

 Eleonora Gonzaga, Duchess of Urbino (1493–1570), daughter of Francesco II Gonzaga; wife of Francesco Maria I della Rovere, Duke of Urbino
 Eleonora Gonzaga (1598–1655), daughter of Vincenzo I Gonzaga & Eleonora de' Medici; wife of Ferdinand II, Holy Roman Emperor
 Eleonora Gonzaga (1630–1686), great-niece of previous, daughter of Charles II Gonzaga; wife of Ferdinand III, Holy Roman Emperor